Homines (meaning "men") may refer to :

The name Boni Homines or Bonshommes was popularly given to at least three religious institutes in the Catholic Church.
The Portuguese Boni Homines, or Secular Canons of St. John the Evangelist were a Catholic religious institute.
Homines Intelligentiae is the name assumed by a heretical sect in the Low Countries, which in 1410-11 was cited before the Inquisition at Brussels.
Argumenta ad homines consists of replying to an argument or factual claim by attacking or appealing to a characteristic or belief of the source making the argument or claim.

See also 
Hominy